Abnormal is the debut album by Bacil & Rakby released on 20 June 2012 on Bottleshop records.

Track listing

See also
 European hip hop
 The 100 Greatest Slovak Albums of All Time

References

2012 albums
Slovak-language albums